Short line or Short Line can refer to:
Shortline railroad, an independent railroad company that operates over a relatively short distance
"Short Line", one of the four railroads in the US edition of the popular board game Monopoly, probably named after the Shore Fast Line, an interurban streetcar line
Short Line (bus company), also known as ShortLine, a bus operator in New York State, United States
Short Line Reading Series, a popular Vancouver literary event presented by Memewar Magazine
The Merriam Park Subdivision, also known as the "Short Line", a section of railroad track owned by the Chicago, Milwaukee, St. Paul and Pacific Railroad between Minneapolis and St. Paul, Minnesota
Short Line Bridge, part of the track over the Mississippi River
"Short Line Road", now known as Ayd Mill Road, a parallel highway
Short Line Subdivision (Ohio), a belt line around Cleveland, Ohio, now owned by CSX
 the New York Short Line, a railway line in Pennsylvania